is a retired amateur Japanese freestyle wrestler, who competed in the men's middleweight category. He achieved top eight finishes in the 74-kg division at the Asian Games (2002 and 2006), scored two bronze medals at the 2001 and 2004 Asian Wrestling Championships, and also represented his nation Japan at the 2004 Summer Olympics. Before his sporting career ended in late 2006, Obata trained as part of the men's freestyle wrestling squad at Yamanashi Gakuin University under his coach and mentor Yuji Takada.

Obata emerged into the global spotlight by taking home the bronze medal in the 76-kg division at the 2001 Asian Wrestling Championships in Ulaanbaatar, Mongolia. He also entered the 2002 Asian Games in Busan, South Korea as one of the heavy medal favorites in the middleweight category, but left empty-handed with a seventh-place finish.

At the 2004 Summer Olympics in Athens, Obata qualified for his first Japanese squad in the men's 74 kg class. Earlier in the process, he rounded out the top ten spots at the 2003 World Wrestling Championships in New York City, New York, and then guaranteed his spot on the Japanese team by placing third from the Asian Championships in Tehran, Iran. He easily ousted India's Sujeet Maan on his opening match 8–0, but could not resemble a scoring margin to turn down Cuba's Iván Fundora on the mat in his second bout. Placing second in the prelim pool and twelfth in the final standings, Obata's performance fell short to put him further into the quarterfinals.

At the 2006 Asian Games in Doha, Qatar, Obata notched a pair of two easy victories in the same tournament, but could not score enough points to dismantle Uzbekistan's Soslan Tigiev for the bronze medal 0–4, dropping him to fifth.

References

External links
 
 JOC Profile 

1980 births
Living people
Olympic wrestlers of Japan
Wrestlers at the 2004 Summer Olympics
Wrestlers at the 2002 Asian Games
Wrestlers at the 2006 Asian Games
Sportspeople from Yamaguchi Prefecture
Japanese male sport wrestlers
Asian Games competitors for Japan
Asian Wrestling Championships medalists
20th-century Japanese people
21st-century Japanese people